is a Japanese writer active during the late Shōwa and early Heisei period periods of Japan.

Biography
Fujisawa was born in the former Uchino-machi (then in Nishikanbara District, Niigata Prefecture; now part of Nishi-ku, Niigata), and a graduate of the Literature Department of Hosei University.

In 1998, he was awarded the prestigious Akutagawa Prize for his novel Buenosu Airesu gozen reiji (Midnight In Buenos Aires).

He is currently working as a professor at Hosei University.

References

J'Lit | Authors : Shu Fujisawa* | Books from Japan

1959 births
Living people
People from Niigata (city)
20th-century Japanese novelists
21st-century Japanese novelists
Hosei University alumni
Academic staff of Hosei University
Akutagawa Prize winners